The 1994 SMU Mustangs football team represented Southern Methodist University (SMU) as a member of the Southwest Conference (SWC) during the 1994 NCAA Division I-A football season. Led by fourth-year head coach Tom Rossley, the Mustangs compiled an overall record of 1–9–1 with a mark of 0–6–1 in conference play, placing last out of eight teams in the SWC.

The highlight of the campaign was a 21-21 tie vs. Texas A&M, which went 10-0-1 but was ineligible to win the SWC championship and participate in a bowl game (and was also banned from television) due to harsh penalties enforced by the NCAA for numerous rule violations. It was the last tie for the Mustangs and Aggies, as the NCAA adopted overtime for regular season games starting in 1996. 

This was the final season SMU played home games at Ownby Stadium, although the Mustangs moved their home game with Houston to the nearby Cotton Bowl. The scheduled home game with Texas A&M was shifted to the Alamodome in San Antonio for a guarantee of the gate; most of the crowd of over 51,000 wore the Aggies' Maroon and White.  

The regular season finale vs. TCU was the Mustangs' last on-campus home game until the opening of Gerald J. Ford Stadium.

Schedule

Roster

References

SMU
SMU Mustangs football seasons
SMU Mustangs football